Bendigo railway station is located on the Deniliquin and Piangil lines in Victoria, Australia. It serves the city of Bendigo, and opened on 21 October 1862 as Sandhurst. It was renamed Bendigo on 1 September 1891.

Situated on the eastern edge of the central business district of Bendigo, the name of the station was changed in 1891, when the city was also renamed. The station also serves as the terminus for many of V/Line's Bendigo line services.

The station was rebuilt after being destroyed by fire on 23 December 1965.

The station building on Platform 2 was refurbished in 1984. The light refreshment booth was demolished around that time, and the footbridge and ironwork were repainted. Additional refurbishments occurred in 1988.

During 1989/1990, much of the station and yard was rearranged to its current layout, including the abolition of signal boxes "A", "B", "C" and "D", and the provision of new signal masts and turnouts.

The disused station at Golden Square is located between Bendigo and Kangaroo Flat.

Platforms and services
Bendigo has two side platforms. Platform 1 is on the north-west side and Platform 2 is on the south-east side of the railway line. Both platforms are used by V/Line Bendigo, Echuca and Swan Hill line services.

Platform 1:
 services to Epsom, Eaglehawk, Echuca, Swan Hill and Southern Cross; terminating services

Platform 2:
 services to Epsom, Eaglehawk, Echuca, Swan Hill and Southern Cross; terminating services

Transport links
Christian's Bus Company operates thirteen routes via Bendigo station, under contract to Public Transport Victoria:
: Huntly – Kangaroo Flat
: to Epsom station
: to Eaglehawk
: to Eaglehawk
: to Eaglehawk
: to Maiden Gully
: to Kangaroo Flat
: to East Bendigo
: to La Trobe University Bendigo Campus
: to Spring Gully
: Bendigo Base Hospital – La Trobe University Bendigo Campus
: to Golden Square
: to Spring Gully

Organ's Coaches operates one route to and from Bendigo station, under contract to Public Transport Victoria:
to 

Whitmores Bus Lines operates one route to and from Bendigo station, under contract to Public Transport Victoria:
: to Strathfieldsaye

Gallery

References

External links

Victorian Railway Stations gallery
Melway map at street-directory.com.au

Railway stations in Australia opened in 1862
Regional railway stations in Victoria (Australia)
Transport in Bendigo
Bendigo